E. O. Paton Electric Welding Institute is a welding research institution situated in Kyiv, Ukraine.  It is named after its founder, Professor Evgeny Paton.

The institute was established in 1934 following the decree of Ukrainian Academy of Sciences. The institute was formed from the Laboratories of the State Electric Welding Committee and Electric Welding department of Kyiv Polytechnic Institute in 1934.  Until 1991 it was known as Ukrainian SSR Academy of Sciences Electric Welding Institute. The first leader of the institute was Evgeny Paton. For many years the institute was directed by Evgeny Paton's son, Borys Paton. Since 2020 following Borys Paton's death the institute is led by Ihor Krivtsun

Currently the institute research staff includes 70 Doctor of Science, 250 Kandidats of Science. The institute is the main Ukrainian research facility dealing with electric welding and electrical discharge machining.

Directors
 1934 – 1953 Yevgeniy Paton
 1953 – 2020 Borys Paton, a chairman of the National Academy of Sciences of Ukraine
 2020 – Ihor Krivtsun

References

External links
Official Website
Wire Drawing Dies

Engineering research institutes
Materials science institutes
Research institutes in the Soviet Union
Welding organizations
Research institutes in Kyiv
Institutes of the National Academy of Sciences of Ukraine
NASU department of physical and technical issues of material studies
Igor Sikorsky Kyiv Polytechnic Institute
Research institutes established in 1934